Merremia hirta is a species of flowering plant in the family Convolvulaceae, native to India, southern China, Southeast Asia, Malesia, Papuasia, and Queensland.

Subtaxa
The following subtaxa are accepted:
Merremia hirta var. hirta – entire range
Merremia hirta var. retusa  – Philippines

References

hirta
Flora of India (region)
Flora of Assam (region)
Flora of East Himalaya
Flora of Bangladesh
Flora of South-Central China
Flora of Southeast China
Flora of Indo-China
Flora of Malesia
Flora of Papuasia
Flora of Queensland
Plants described in 1939